R. D. Ampaw is a former Ghanaian lawyer and civil servant and was the Inspector General of Police of the Ghana Police Service from 14 June 1971 to 13 January 1972.

References
 

Ghanaian civil servants
Ghanaian Inspector Generals of Police
20th-century Ghanaian lawyers
Possibly living people
Year of birth missing